Admiral Sir Henry Frederick Nicholson  (21 October 1835 – 17 October 1914) was a Royal Navy officer who served as Commander-in-Chief, The Nore.

Naval career
Nicholson joined the Royal Navy in 1849.

He was Captain of HMS Temeraire at the Bombardment of Alexandria in 1882 and went on to be Captain of HMS Asia in 1884. He became Commander-in-Chief, Cape of Good Hope and West Coast of Africa Station in 1890 and Commander-in-Chief, The Nore in 1896. He retired in 1897.

He died in 1914.

Family
Nicholson married, in 1874, Frances Anne Thomson, daughter of George Thomson, QC, of New Brunswick. Lady Nicholson was godmother to HMS Proserpine on her launch at Sheerness Dockyard on 5 December 1896.

References

|-

1835 births
1914 deaths
Royal Navy admirals
Knights Commander of the Order of the Bath
People from Upnor
Military personnel from Kent